The Mississippi State Bulldogs softball team represents Mississippi State University in NCAA Division I college softball. The team participates in the Western Division of the Southeastern Conference (SEC). The Bulldogs are currently led by head coach Samantha Ricketts. The team plays its home games at Nusz Park located on the university's campus.

Year-by-year results

Awards and honors

National awards
NFCA Golden Shoe Award
Chelsea Bramlett (2009)
Lisa Clemons (2002)

NFCA Catcher of the Year
Keri McCallum (2000)
Chelsea Bramlett (2008, 2009, 2010)
Mia Davidson (2022)

Conference awards
SEC Player of the Year
Iyhia McMichael (2003, 2004)

SEC Freshman of the Year
Courtney Bures (2005)
Chelsea Bramlett (2007)
Mia Davidson (2018)

NFCA All-Americans

Perfect games
The following two perfect games have been thrown by Mississippi State pitchers over the program's history.

March 2, 1997. Jenny Hehnke vs Alabama State (won 18–0, 5 innings)
February 9, 2018. Holly Ward vs Mississippi Valley State (won 10–0, 5 innings)

See also
List of NCAA Division I softball programs

References

External links